Interleukin-25 (IL-25) – also known as interleukin-17E (IL-17E) – is a protein that in humans is encoded by the IL25 gene on chromosome 14. IL-25 was discovered in 2001 and is made up of 177 amino acids.

IL-25 and IL-17 family 
IL-25 is a cytokine that belongs to the IL-17 cytokine family together with IL-17A (named also IL-17), IL-17B, IL-17C, IL-17D and IL-17F. This is why IL-25 has the alternative name IL-17E. All members have homologous amino acid sequence segments and spatially conserved cysteines. It is the IL-25 that differs from other members in its function and structure.

IL-25 has a heterodimeric receptor. The receptor is composed of two subunits IL-17RA and IL-17RB. The IL-17RA subunit is also common for IL-17A and IL-17F. And Il-17RB is also common for IL-17B. Both subunit receptors are essential for IL-25 functions. IL-25 does not bind directly to IL-17RA, but this subunit is necessary for its functions - as well as IL-17RB which directly bind IL-25.

Function 

IL-25 is produced by many cell types. These cells include T cells, dendritic cells, macrophages, mast cells, basophils, eosinophils, epithelial cells and Paneth cells.

This cytokine can induce NF-κB activation, and stimulate the production of IL-8 (named also CXCL8), which is the major chemotactic substance of neutrophils.

Another important function of interleukin 25 is to support the Th2 immune response. IL-25 has been shown to induce the production of IL-4, IL-5 and IL-13. Evidence is the expression of IL-17RB on Th2 cells, not on Th1 and Th17. In addition, IL-25 is responsible for the decrease in IFN gamma.

Because IL-25 promotes the development of a Th2 immune response, it acts to protect against several bowel infections caused by helminths. This role of IL-25 has been demonstrated in these intestinal parasites - Nippostrongylus brasiliensis , Trichuris muris , Trichinella spiralis  a Heligmosomoides polygyrus bekeri. 

IL-25 is also referred to as the regulator of IL-9 production. IL-25 has been shown to increase the production of IL-9 in Th9 cells. Th9 cells can arise not only from naive T cells but also from differentiated Th2 cells.

Another function of IL-25 is the activation of natural lymphoid cells 2 (ILC2). IL-25 and IL-33 are the most potent activators of ILC2.

Clinical significance 

IL-25 induces the production of other cytokines, including IL-4, IL-5 and IL-13 in multiple tissues, which stimulate the expansion of eosinophils.  This cytokine is an important molecule controlling immunity of the gut and has been implicated in chronic inflammation associated with the gastrointestinal tract. IL-25 can kill some types of breast cancer cells.

Further, the IL-25 gene has been identified in a chromosomal region associated with diseases of the gut such as inflammatory bowel disease (IBD), although no direct evidence suggests that IL-25 plays any role in this disease.

IL-25 has potent antitumor activity in vivo in several human cancers including melanoma, breast, lung, colon, and pancreatic cancers, suggesting the potential clinical use of IL-17E as an anticancer agent.

IL-25 and allergy 
IL-25 works pathologically in allergies. It is a cytokine that supports the Th2 response. IL-25 induces IL-4, IL-5 a IL-13, cytokines which play important role in allergies.

Many studies suggest that blocking IL-25 activity might be useful in the treatment of allergies. Research studies suggest the blocking of IL-25 activity by the neutralizing antibody against IL-25. A delayed Th2 differentiation and delayed production of cytokines IL-4, IL-5 and IL-13 have been demonstrated in the IL-25 knockout mouse.

IL-25 influences the development of nasal polyps, and may also be involved in the etiology of chronic rhinitis with nasal polyps. A 2018 study found that after using a non-neutralizing antibody against IL-25, IL-4, IL-5, and IL-13 decreased, and the number of nasal polyps decreased.

Another proposed option of treating allergies with IL-25 is a combination of neutralizing antibodies against IL-25, IL-33 and TSLP (thymic stromal lymphopoietin). All three of these cytokines support the Th2 immune response.

References

Further reading 

 
 
 
 
 
 
 

Interleukins